Copelatus amaroides is a species diving beetle. It is part of the genus Copelatus in the subfamily Copelatinae of the family Dytiscidae. It was described by Guignot in 1952.

References

amaroides
Beetles described in 1952